Beach Boys Concert is the first live album by American rock band the Beach Boys, released on October 19, 1964. It is their seventh album in all, and their third alone in the same year. It was their first of two chart-topping albums in the US (the other was their 1974 greatest hit compilation, Endless Summer), as well as the first live album to top pop music record charts, maintaining its position for four weeks during a sixty-two-week chart stay, and becoming another gold seller.

The album was recorded live at the Memorial Auditorium in Sacramento, California, though it received heavy post-production treatment. Because Brian Wilson was about to vacate his position in the live group, and would only perform sporadically with them over the course of the next three decades, it is one of the few live documents of the original line up of the Beach Boys in officially released LP form.

In 2014, Live in Sacramento 1964 was released, containing additional performances from these concert dates.

Recording
The album includes several songs that the Beach Boys regularly performed live but had not previously included on an album, such as "Papa-Oom-Mow-Mow", "The Wanderer" and "Monster Mash". "The Little Old Lady from Pasadena" was actually a Jan & Dean hit.  Alongside those were a sampling of their favorites, such as "Hawaii", "Fun, Fun, Fun", and "I Get Around". "Little Deuce Coupe", "In My Room", "Johnny B. Goode" and "Long Tall Texan" dated from the December 21, 1963 show.

Variations
A truncated version was released on Pickwick Records as Wow! Great Concert! Beach Boys Concert (Capitol (S)TAO 2198) When their albums were remastered for CD in 1990 (and again in 2001), Concert was paired on CD with Live in London, with bonus tracks from both periods. Bonus tracks include "Don't Worry Baby (Live 1964)" (2:56) and "Heroes And Villains (Live 1967)" (3:47).

Track listing
Side one
"Fun, Fun, Fun" (Brian Wilson, Mike Love) – 2:26
"The Little Old Lady (from Pasadena)" (Don Altfeld, Jan Berry, Roger Christian) – 3:00
"Little Deuce Coupe" (Brian Wilson, Roger Christian) – 2:27
"Long, Tall Texan" (Henry Strezlecki) – 2:32
"In My Room" (Brian Wilson, Gary Usher) – 2:25
"Monster Mash" (Bobby Pickett, Lenny Capizzi) – 2:27
"Let's Go Trippin'" (Dick Dale) – 2:34

Side two
"Papa-Oom-Mow-Mow" (Carl White, Al Frazier, Sonny Harris, Turner Wilson Jr.) – 2:18
"The Wanderer" (Ernest Maresca) – 2:00
"Hawaii" (Brian Wilson, Mike Love) – 1:51
"Graduation Day" (Joe Sherman, Noel Sherman) – 3:29
"I Get Around" (Brian Wilson, Mike Love) – 2:42
"Johnny B. Goode" (Chuck Berry) – 1:56

Personnel
The Beach Boys
Mike Love – vocals; saxophone on "Let's Go Trippin'" and "Long Tall Texan"
Al Jardine – vocals; rhythm guitar; bass guitar on "The Wanderer"
Brian Wilson – vocals; bass guitar; drums on "The Wanderer"
Carl Wilson – vocals, lead guitar
Dennis Wilson – drums; lead vocals on "The Wanderer"

Charts

References

Sources
 Beach Boys Concert/Live in London CD booklet notes, David Leaf, c.1990.
 
 "The Nearest Faraway Place: Brian Wilson, The Beach Boys and the Southern California Experience", Timothy White, c. 1994.

External links

The Beach Boys live albums
1964 live albums
Capitol Records live albums
Albums produced by Brian Wilson